Kaura Lighthouse is a coastal lighthouse in the municipality of Åfjord in Trøndelag county, Norway. The lighthouse was built in 1931 and automated in 1959.

The red, cylindrical, cast iron tower has one white stripe around it and a white, stone foundation. The 4,050-candela light emits two flashes every 10 seconds, flashing white, red, or green depending on direction.

See also

Lighthouses in Norway
List of lighthouses in Norway

References

External links
 Norsk Fyrhistorisk Forening 
 Picture of Kaura Lighthouse

Lighthouses completed in 1931
Åfjord
Lighthouses in Trøndelag
1931 establishments in Norway